Mohammad Irfan (22 August 1951 – 10 March 2016) was an Indian politician and a member of the 16th Legislative Assembly of Uttar Pradesh of India. He represented the Bilari constituency of Uttar Pradesh and was a member of the Samajwadi Party.

Early life and education
Mohammad Irfan was born in Bilari, Moradabad, Uttar Pradesh. He held a Bachelor of Science and Bachelor of Laws degrees from Kedar Nath Girdharilal Khatri PG College and M. J. P. Rohilkhand University. Before being elected as MLA, he worked as an agriculturist and advocate.

Political career
Irfan was a MLA for one term. He represented the Bilari (Assembly constituency) and was a member of the Samajwadi Party.

Posts held

References 

1951 births
2016 deaths
People from Moradabad district
Samajwadi Party politicians
Uttar Pradesh MLAs 2012–2017